The Great Canadian Bagel is a coffee house and quick service restaurant chain and franchise. It was established in 1993 and is an affiliate of The Great American Bagel Bakery.  it has 18 stores located in Alberta, Ontario, New Brunswick, and Prince Edward Island.

See also
List of Canadian restaurant chains

References

External links 
 

Restaurant chains in Canada
Companies based in Vaughan
Companies established in 1993
1993 establishments in Ontario